Henry Bennett or Bennet may refer to:

Henry Bennet, 1st Earl of Arlington (1618–1685), English statesman 
Henry Bennett (U.S. politician) (1808–1874), U.S. Representative from New York
Henry Boswell Bennett (1809–1838), British officer who died in service of Queen Victoria
Henry G. Bennett (1886–1951), prominent educational figure in Oklahoma
Gordon Bennett (general) (Henry Gordon Bennett, 1887–1962), Australian general
Henry Holcomb Bennett (1863–1924), American writer
Henry Bennett (rose hybridizer) (1823–1890), British pioneer in the systematic, deliberate hybridisation of roses
Henry Curtis-Bennett (1879–1936), English barrister and Member of Parliament
Henry R. Bennett (1819 – c.1896), English organist
Henry Bennet (translator) ( 1561), English translator of Protestant literature
Henry Grey Bennet (1777–1836), British politician
Henry Bennett (cricketer) (1869–1965), English cricketer
Henry Stanley Bennett (1889–1972), English literary historian

See also
J. Henry Bennett (1876–1956), member of the Wisconsin State Senate
Harry Bennett (disambiguation)